This is a list of songs produced by Dallas Austin.

See also
The Urban Hymnal

References

Austin, Dallas